Akuliaruseq is a 1352 m high mountain in southern Greenland.

References 

Mountains of Greenland
One-thousanders of Greenland